is a railway station in the city of Hekinan, Aichi Prefecture,  Japan, operated by Meitetsu.

Lines

Station layout
The station has two opposed side platforms connected to the station building by a level crossing. The station has automatic turnstiles for the Tranpass system of magnetic fare cards, and is unattended.

Platforms

Adjacent stations

|-
!colspan=5|Nagoya Railroad

Station history
Shinkawa-machi Station was opened on February 5, 1914, as a station on the privately owned Mikawa Railway Company. The Mikawa Railway Company was taken over by Meitetsu on June 1, 1941. The station has been unattended since 2005.

Passenger statistics
In fiscal 2017, the station was used by an average of 1298 passengers daily (boarding passengers only).

Surrounding area
Shinkawa Elementary School
Shinkawa Junior High School
Kobayashi Memorial Hospital

See also
 List of Railway Stations in Japan

References

External links

 Official web page

Railway stations in Japan opened in 1914
Railway stations in Aichi Prefecture
Stations of Nagoya Railroad
Hekinan, Aichi